Bonnie W. Ramsey is the Endowed Chair in Cystic Fibrosis at the University of Washington School of Medicine and the director of the Center for Clinical and Translational Research at Seattle Children's Research Institute. Her research focuses on treatments for cystic fibrosis.

Education 
Ramsey earned a BA from Stanford University in 1972, and an MD from Harvard Medical School in 1976. She completed a residency at Boston Children's Hospital followed by a fellowship at Seattle Children's Hospital.

Career 

Ramsey joined the faculty at Seattle Children's Hospital in 1979. In 2005, she was named the Endowed Chair in Cystic Fibrosis at the University of Washington School of Medicine. She is also the director of the Center for Clinical and Translational Research at Seattle Children's Research Institute.

She was elected as a fellow of the National Academy of Medicine in 2015. She received the Warren Alpert Foundation Prize in 2018.

References 

University of Washington faculty
Stanford University alumni
Harvard Medical School alumni
Members of the National Academy of Medicine
American pediatricians
Women pediatricians
Year of birth missing (living people)
Living people